The New York circuit courts were circuit courts created by the New York State Constitution of 1821, and abolished by the Constitution of 1846.

History
Under the provisions of the Constitution of New York, 1777, the justices of the New York Supreme Court had been holding traveling circuit courts. Under the Constitution of 1821, the state was divided in eight senatorial districts, so known because each district elected four senators, which were also used as judicial divisions. The circuit courts were organized by an act passed April 17, 1823. The circuit court judges were appointed by the Governor and confirmed by the State Senate. The circuit courts ceased to exist on July 5, 1847, when the jurisdiction was taken over by the district benches of the New York Supreme Court the justices of which had been elected at the special judicial election in May 1847.

List of judges

First Circuit
1823–1841 Ogden Edwards
1841–1845 William Kent
1845–1847 John W. Edmonds

Second Circuit
1823–1827 Samuel Betts
1827–1831 James Emott
1831–1846 Charles H. Ruggles
1846 Selah B. Strong (declined)
1846–1847 Seward Barculo

Third Circuit
1823–1830 William Alexander Duer
1830–1838 James Vanderpoel
1838–1844 John P. Cushman
1844–1847 Amasa J. Parker

Fourth Circuit
1823–1828 Reuben H. Walworth
1828–1836 Esek Cowen
1838–1847 John Willard

Fifth Circuit
1823–1834 Nathan Williams
1834 Samuel Beardsley
1834–1838 Hiram Denio
1838 Isaac H. Bronson
1838–1847 Philo Gridley

Sixth Circuit
1823–1831 Samuel Nelson
1831–1846 Robert Monell
1846–1847 Hiram Gray

Seventh Circuit
1823–1828 Enos Throop
1829–1844 Daniel Moseley
1844–1847 Bowen Whiting

Eighth Circuit
1823–1826 William B. Rochester
1826 Albert H. Tracy (declined)
1826–1829 John Birdsall
1829–1838 Addison Gardiner
1838 John B. Skinner
1838–1847 Nathan Dayton

References

 

New York (state) state courts
Legal history of New York (state)
1823 establishments in New York (state)
1847 disestablishments in New York (state)
Courts and tribunals established in 1823
Courts and tribunals disestablished in 1847